Andy Ram and Vera Zvonareva defeated Bob Bryan and Venus Williams in the final, 6–3, 6–2 to win the mixed doubles tennis title at the 2006 Wimbledon Championships.

Mahesh Bhupathi and Mary Pierce were the defending champions, but Pierce did not compete. Bhupathi partnered with Yan Zi, but lost in the second round to Bryan and Williams.

Seeds
All seeds received a bye into the second round. 

  Jonas Björkman /  Lisa Raymond (third round, withdrew)
  Max Mirnyi /  Zheng Jie (semifinals)
  Wayne Black /  Cara Black (semifinals)
  Leander Paes /  Samantha Stosur (quarterfinals)
  Daniel Nestor /  Elena Likhovtseva (quarterfinals)
  Todd Perry /  Rennae Stubbs (third round)
  Nenad Zimonjić /  Katarina Srebotnik (quarterfinals)
  Mark Knowles /  Martina Navratilova (third round)
  Andy Ram /  Vera Zvonareva (champions)
  Martin Damm /  Květa Peschke (third round)
  Mahesh Bhupathi /  Yan Zi (second round)
  Leoš Friedl /  Liezel Huber (second round)
  Mike Bryan /  Corina Morariu (third round)
  Jonathan Erlich /  Dinara Safina (second round)
  Kevin Ullyett /  Shahar Pe'er (second round)
  František Čermák /  Anna-Lena Grönefeld (quarterfinals)

Draw

Finals

Top half

Section 1

Section 2

Bottom half

Section 3

Section 4

References

External links

2006 Wimbledon Championships on WTAtennis.com
2006 Wimbledon Championships – Doubles draws and results at the International Tennis Federation

X=Mixed Doubles
Wimbledon Championship by year – Mixed doubles